GaySurfers.net is a global community that promotes diversity within the surfing community and provide the means for LGBT surfers to connect. The website was featured in the award-winning documentary film Out in the Lineup.

History
GaySurfers.net was created in 2010 by Thomas Castets, who also produced the Out in the Lineup, a documentary that explores homophobia in the surfing community. Castets, a surfer from Sydney, Australia, created the website hoping to find out if there were any other gay surfers. Within weeks of launching the website, more than 300 surfers contacted him.

See also

 Athlete Ally
 Homosocialization
 You Can Play

References

External links
 

Australian sport websites
LGBT-related websites
Surfing mass media